The Rock Island District (RI) is a Metra commuter rail line from Chicago, Illinois, southwest to Joliet. Metra does not refer to its lines by color, but the timetable accents for the Rock Island District line are "Rocket Red" in honor of the Chicago, Rock Island and Pacific Railroad's Rocket passenger trains.

History
The Suburban Line was built in 1870 as a steam dummy line, splitting from the main line just north of 99th Street, running west along 99th and turning south to the present line at the S-curve just south of 99th. The crossing of the Pittsburgh, Cincinnati, Chicago and St. Louis Railway midway along 99th was known as Dummy Crossing. In the early 1890s the line was extended north to 89th Street in conjunction with the expansion of the Chicago Terminal Transfer Railroad, and the portion on 99th was removed.

The track is owned by Metra, bought from the bankrupt Chicago, Rock Island and Pacific Railroad for $35 million in December 1982 (equivalent to $ in ). The Regional Transportation Authority had signed a contract with the Rock Island in 1976 to fund service, and in 1980 the Chicago and North Western Railway began operating the Rock Island District (the Rock Island also ceased operations that year.) In spring 1981 the C&NW stepped away, and the Northeast Illinois Regional Commuter Railroad Corporation (Metra) was formed to take over operations. Through freight trains on the line are operated by CSX and Iowa Interstate Railroad on a trackage rights agreement. In addition, Chicago Rail Link has rights to operate local freight service on the whole district, and it also uses the line between Gresham Wye and Blue Island to connect with the Iowa Interstate and Indiana Harbor Belt Railroads.

A new station at 35th Street and Federal Street opened on April 3, 2011 to serve U.S. Cellular Field and the Illinois Institute of Technology. It was named 35th Street/'Lou' Jones/Bronzeville Station after Lovana Jones who was an Illinois State Representative in the Bronzeville neighborhood.

The Englewood Flyover, an overpass located in the Chicago neighborhood of Englewood, eliminated delays for the Rock Island. The overpass replaced a diamond crossing with the Norfolk Southern's Chicago Line. The overpass proposed by Chicago Region Environmental and Transportation Efficiency Program (CREATE), which cost $142 million to construct, was completed in October 2014.

In recent years, Metra has expressed a desire to electrify and modernize the line if funding became available.

Service
Between Gresham and Blue Island, 17 of the Joliet roundtrips and all three Tinley Park trains operate on the main line, while the other four Joliet roundtrips and all Blue Island short-turn trains operate on the suburban branch.

On Saturdays,  Metra operates 33 trains (16 inbound and 17 outbound) on the line, with 10 roundtrips to and from Joliet, six roundtrips to and from Blue Island, and an additional outbound train to Joliet. Of these trains, six Joliet roundtrips operate on the mainline, while the Blue Island short-turn trains as well as four Joliet roundtrips and an additional outbound Joliet train operate via the suburban branch.

On Sundays, Metra operates twenty-eight trains (14 roundtrips), eight to and from Joliet, and six to and from Blue Island. Of these, six of the Joliet roundtrips operate via the main line while the other two Joliet trains as well as all Blue Island short-turns operate via the suburban branch.

The Rock Island District consists of the former Rock Island main line to Joliet and the slightly longer suburban branch that loops to the west between Gresham and Blue Island. Most trains use the latter; the two stations on that part of the main line are served only during weekday rush hours.

In June 2015, Metra began weekend express service on the Rock Island District. The six express trains that operate on both Saturday and Sunday run express from 35th Street to Blue Island-Vermont Street before making all stops to Joliet, bypassing the suburban branch entirely. Local trains run as well, making all stops on the suburban branch and terminating at Blue Island-Vermont Street. This cuts about 20 minutes off the trips from Blue Island to downtown. On August 23, 2015, Metra announced that the weekend express service would become permanent upon completion of the trial period on November 29, 2015.

The Rock Island District runs a few empty equipment move (deadhead) trains, most during weekdays. Inbound deadheads are scheduled between the Joliet, Mokena-Front Street, and Tinley Park stations and run to Blue Island-Vermont Street.

There have been proposals to extend the line from Joliet to LaSalle-Peru in LaSalle County with intermediate stations at Rockdale, Minooka, Morris, Seneca, Marseilles, Ottawa, and several other towns. A feasibility study was completed in 2003. As of 2022, an extension only as far as Minooka has been considered feasible in the near future, and there are no currently active plans to carry out the extension.

After the passage of the Rebuild Illinois, $20 million was allocated for the long planned construction of a new  station. Construction is expected to start in 2020.

In the beginning of 2021, fares on the Rock Island, as well as the Metra Electric District, were cut in half for all passengers as part of a pilot program.

Ridership
From 2014-2019 annual ridership declined from 8,544,753 to 7,338,133, an overall decline of 14.1%. Due to the COVID-19 pandemic, ridership dropped to 1,952,547 passengers in 2020 and 1,669,273 passengers in 2021.

Stations

See also
Beverly/Morgan Railroad District

Notes

References
J. David Ingles, Metra: "Best Commuter Train", Trains July 1993

External links

 

Chicago, Rock Island and Pacific Railroad
Metra lines